Coteau-du-Lac is a small city in southwestern Quebec, Canada. It is on the north shore of the St. Lawrence River in the Vaudreuil-Soulanges Regional County Municipality.

The name of the town comes from the French word Coteau which meant "slope" and from its location on the north shore of Lake Saint Francis. The National Historic Site of Canada of the Coteau-du-Lac canal is the location of the first canal lock system in North America. The city has an industrial park.

The population was 7,044 as of the 2016 Canadian Census.

History
The place was mentioned in 1687 by Marquis de Denonville. His record stated that " du Lac is a place where one stopped on the way to the Rapides d'en Haut", referring to a small hillside (French: coteau) on the north side of the St. Lawrence River near the mouth of Lake Saint Francis (French: lac Saint-François).

In 1779 the Coteau-du-Lac canal was constructed to bypass the numerous rapids between Lake Saint-Louis and Lake Saint-Francis. Two years later, a military detachment was stationed there. In 1789, its post office opened under the name Coteau-du-Lac.

During the War of 1812, a fort was built to protect the canal. In 1832, the Parish of Saint-Ignace was created. The following year, the parish was civilly established under the name "Saint Ignace du Côteau du Lac". In 1845 it was formed into a municipality, but abolished in 1847. In 1855, it was reestablished as the Parish Municipality of Saint-Ignace-du-Côteau-du-Lac.

In 1907, the Village Municipality of Côteau-du-Lac was formed out of Saint-Ignace-du-Côteau-du-Lac (orthography was later changed to "Coteau" without circumflex). These 2 entities merged again on 6 February 1982, to form the Municipality of Coteau-du-Lac, which changed statutes in 2007 to become a city.

In mid-2013, around 120 people were temporarily evacuated, and 2 people died after an explosion in the local fireworks factory.

Demographics 

Local government

List of former mayors (since formation of current municipality):
 Joseph Henri Paul Fernand Desforges (1982–1989)
 Pierre Chevrier (1989–1996)
 Robert Sauvé (1996–2013)
 Guy Jasmin (2013–2017)
 Andrée Brosseau (2017–present)

Education
Commission Scolaire des Trois-Lacs operates Francophone schools.
École de Coteau-du-Lac (pavillons Académie-Wilson, de l'Éclusière, and Saint-Ignace)

Lester B. Pearson School Board operates Anglophone schools.
 Evergreen Elementary and Forest Hill Elementary (Junior Campus and Senior campus) in Saint-Lazare or Soulanges Elementary School in Saint-Télesphore

Notable people
 Jules Fournier (1884-1918) was a Canadian writer and newspaper owner

See also
 List of cities in Quebec

References

External links

 Official website 

Cities and towns in Quebec
Quebec populated places on the Saint Lawrence River
Incorporated places in Vaudreuil-Soulanges Regional County Municipality